The 1985 Nobel Prize in Literature was awarded to the French novelist Claude Simon "who in his novel combines the poet's and the painter's creativeness with a deepened awareness of time in the depiction of the human condition".

Laureate

Associated with the French nouveau roman, Simon's novels are largely autobiographical. He fought in World War II and the Spanish civil war and these are recurring events in his novels. He published his first novel in 1945. His most important works include L'Herbe (1958), La Route des Flandres (1960), Le Palace (1962) and Histoire (1967).

Nominations
Following the publication of his major works, Claude Simon was nominated for the Nobel Prize in Literature by various members of the Swedish Academy six times between 1967 and 1971. In 1969 he had been proposed as a main candidate for the prize by several members of the Nobel committee.

Reactions
Claude Simon was among the favourites to win the 1985 Nobel Prize in Literature along with other frequently mentioned candidates Nadine Gordimer, Jorge Luis Borges, Graham Greene and Günter Grass. Claude Simon was assumed to be a strong contender for the prize as Nobel committee member Artur Lundkvist in 1983 had said that that years laureate William Golding did not deserve the Nobel Prize and that it should have been awarded to Claude Simon instead. “This is a courageous choice by the Nobel committee,” said Roger Shattuck, a professor of French at the University of Virginia. “Simon’s works are neither popular nor traditional. Simon has earned a place as a major writer working seriously to extend the relations between language, vision and the novel form.” The president of France Francois Mitterrand congratulated Simon saying the author deserved the award for the originality of his work.

Award ceremony speech
In the award ceremony speech on 10 December 1985, Lars Gyllensten of the Swedish Academy said:

References

External links
Award ceremony speech

1985
Nobel Prize